Haley Anne Strode is an American actress. In 2012, she acted alongside Giovanni Ribisi in Gangster Squad, playing his character's wife. She has since starred in Nick@Nite's Wendell & Vinnie and in ABC's The Astronaut Wives Club, playing the role of Jane Conrad.

Early life
Strode was born in Owensboro, Kentucky, and grew up in the nearby town of Stanley on her family's fourth generation farm. Her mother is a retired teacher, and her father is a farmer. She has two older brothers, Jason and Matthew. 

Strode graduated from Apollo High School in Owensboro, and went on to attend the University of Mississippi in Oxford, from which she graduated in 2007 with a BFA in Theatre Arts. While at college, Strode appeared in A Streetcar Named Desire as Stella, Noises Off! as Brooke, and The Importance of Being Earnest as Cecily.

Career
Strode played the role of Windy Stevens in the film Las Angeles, directed by Gerardo Flores, which screened at the Los Angeles Film Festival. 

Strode's career in television began with a role on Comedy Central's Lewis Black's Root of All Evil.

Strode provided the voice of Jess' Mother in the independent film Jess + Moss, which was screened at the 2011 Sundance Film Festival. The film won Best Feature at the Prague Fresh Film Festival, and Best Narrative at the Dallas International Film Festival.  Strode continued 2012 with roles on television series including CSI:NY, Castle, and Whitney, along with the NBC pilot, The New Normal. In 2012, Strode acted in the Nick at Night series Wendell & Vinnie, starring opposite Jerry Trainor.  

Strode appeared in the Warner Bros. release Gangster Squad (2012), directed by Ruben Fleischer. She played the role of Marcia Keeler, alongside Giovanni Ribisi as Detective Conway Keeler. In independent film, Strode played the nemesis of Laura Bell Bundy's character in the film Watercolor Postcards. She next starred in the 2013 film Only in L.A.. 

In 2016, Strode portrayed the role of real-life NASA wife Jane Conrad on ABC's drama series The Astronaut Wives Club. She stars, in flashbacks, as Rita Forrester, the mother of Ed Westwick's character, in ABC's crime drama series Wicked City. She also appeared in CMT's Still the King.

Filmography

Film

Television

Web

References

External links
 

Living people
People from Owensboro, Kentucky
American television actresses
American film actresses
University of Mississippi alumni
20th-century American women
21st-century American actresses
Year of birth missing (living people)